Fort Constantin or Fort Grand Duke Constantine is a historical fortress in Koblenz-Karthause district of Koblenz, Germany, built in 1827/1828. It was part of the Prussian fortress system of Koblenz and Ehrenbreitstein. It was named after the Grand Duke Konstantin Pavlovich of Russia. Currently it is a tourist destination managed by PRO KONSTANTIN e. V.

It is under the protection of the Hague Convention for the Protection of Cultural Property in the Event of Armed Conflict.

References

Further reading
Peter Kleber: Fort Konstantin – Baugeschichte und Aufgabe. In: Fort Konstantin. Historischer Ort mit Zukunft. Koblenz 2013, pp.  19–42
Klaus Weber: Die preußischen Festungsanlagen von Koblenz (1815–1834) (= Kunst- und Kulturwissenschaftliche Forschungen. Band 1). 2003, pp. 197–204
Rüdiger Wischemann: Die Festung Koblenz. Vom römischen Kastell und Preußens stärkster Festung zur größten Garnison der Bundeswehr. Koblenz 1978, pp. 87–88

Buildings and structures in Koblenz
Fortresses in Germany